The Dry is the 2016 debut novel by Australian author Jane Harper. The book has won numerous international awards and has sold more than one million copies worldwide. A film adaptation starring Eric Bana was released on 1 January 2021 with great success, placing it as one of the highest grossing Australian film opening weekends ever.

Synopsis 
Federal Police agent Aaron Falk returns to the struggling farming community of Kiewarra for the funeral of his childhood best friend, Luke Hadler. Severe drought has put the town under extreme pressure and the community is shocked but not surprised when the Hadler family is found dead in their farmhouse. While Falk is loath to confront the townspeople who rejected him twenty years earlier, the circumstances around the deaths of the Hadlers, that appears to be a murder-suicide, compels him to dig deeper into the events leading up to the tragedy.

Reception 
The Dry has won multiple major awards, including the British Book Award for Crime & Thriller Book of the Year 2018, the UK Crime Writer's Association Gold Dagger Award for Best Crime Novel 2017, the Sunday Times Crime Book of the Year Award 2017, Amazon Best Mystery and Thriller Novel Award 2017, Goodreads Choice Award for Best Mystery Thriller and Best Debut 2017, the Australian Book Industry Award for Australian Book of the Year 2017, the Indie Book Award for Book of the Year 2017, the Barry Award for Best First Novel of 2017.

Film adaptation 

The film rights for The Dry were optioned by producers Bruna Papandrea and Reese Witherspoon in 2015 and was produced by Bruna Papandrea's production company, Made Up Stories. Eric Bana starred in the lead role of Aaron Falk, with Genevieve O'Reilly as Gretchen and Keir O'Donnell as Raco.

Principal photography began in March 2019 in the Australian state of Victoria, including the Wimmera Mallee region.

The film was due for release on 27 August 2020 but was delayed due to COVID-19. It was released by Roadshow Films in Australia and New Zealand on January 1, 2021 and broke box office records, making it one of the highest grossing Australian film opening weekends ever.

References

2016 debut novels
Australian crime novels
2016 Australian novels
Australian novels adapted into films
Novels by Jane Harper
Novels set in Australia
Macmillan Publishers books